Mahmud Hasan is a Bangladeshi physician. He was awarded Ekushey Padak by the government of Bangladesh in the category of social welfare in 2017.
He was the president of Bangladesh College of Physicians and Surgeons for two years from 2011–2013.

References

Living people
Recipients of the Ekushey Padak
Place of birth missing (living people)
Year of birth missing (living people)